The Sinclair coefficients are a method to compare different weight classes in Olympic weightlifting.

See also
Wilks coefficient

References

Further reading

External links
International Weightlifting Federation
Sinclair Calculator - calculate sinclair points from kg or lbs

Sports terminology
Weightlifting

de:Gewichtheben#Nach Sinclairpunkten